Vitali Yuryevich Semakin (born 10 August 1976) is a Russian professional football manager and a former player.

Club career
He played 6 seasons in the Russian Football National League for 4 different clubs.

References

External links
 

1976 births
People from Shakhty
Living people
Russian footballers
Association football midfielders
FC SKA Rostov-on-Don players
FC Khimki players
FC Tyumen players
FC Zvezda Irkutsk players
FC Rostov players
Russian football managers
FC Chayka Peschanokopskoye players
FC Chita players
Sportspeople from Rostov Oblast